Gonzalo "Gonchi" Rodríguez Bongoll (January 22, 1972 – September 11, 1999) was a Uruguayan racing driver. He was killed in an accident at Laguna Seca Raceway during practice for a CART race.

Career
He showed promise in Formula 3000 for three seasons, taking two wins in 1998 at Spa-Francorchamps and Nürburgring, winning the following season in Monaco and finishing third in both championships. Following a rotation of drivers as team mates to Al Unser Jr. in CART Penske Racing's second car, he was given his opportunity at the Detroit Grand Prix in 1999 and scored a point in his only race.

Death
At the Laguna Seca Raceway during a practice session for his second CART race, he was fatally injured in a crash. A stuck throttle was initially thought to be the cause for his car overshooting the braking point, leaving the track, striking a tire barrier and slamming into a concrete wall behind the barrier at the entry of the Corkscrew corner. Review of the in-car telemetry refuted this supposition. The impact caused his car to flip over the barrier and land upside down on the other side of the wall. Rodríguez was killed instantly by a basilar skull fracture caused by the impact with the wall, which was lined by only a thin layer of tires. Because of the incident, an additional tire wall was installed at the end of the straight.

Rodríguez had a contract in place to compete in the 2000 CART championship with Patrick Racing.

Legacy
In July 2013, Autosport magazine named Rodríguez one of the 50 greatest drivers never to have raced in Formula One, citing both his mental and physical strength, and his race craft. In 2014, a Spanish-language documentary of his life, Gonchi, was released.

Racing record

Complete International Formula 3000 results
(key) (Races in bold indicate pole position) (Races in italics indicate fastest lap)

Complete American Open Wheel results
(key)

CART

References

External links
Fundación Gonzalo Rodríguez - a foundation which promotes child road safety and physical education
Profile at HistoricRacing.com

1971 births
1999 deaths
British Formula Three Championship drivers
British Formula Renault 2.0 drivers
Champ Car drivers
Sportspeople from Montevideo
Racing drivers who died while racing
Uruguayan racing drivers
Uruguayan people of Spanish descent
Sports deaths in California
International Formula 3000 drivers
British Formula 3000 Championship drivers
Filmed deaths in motorsport
Burials at Cementerio del Buceo, Montevideo
Team Penske drivers
Team Astromega drivers
Alan Docking Racing drivers
People educated at Stella Maris College (Montevideo)